As Time Goes By (in Chinese 去日苦多) is a 1997 documentary film by the Hong Kong director Ann Hui. The film, part of the Taiwan-produced series "Personal Memoir of Hong Kong", is both a self-portrait and a depiction of Hong Kong during the 40 years preceding the handover by the United Kingdom to China.

References

External links

1997 films
Films directed by Ann Hui
Taiwanese documentary films
1997 documentary films
Documentary films about cities
20th century in Hong Kong
Films shot in Hong Kong
Films set in Hong Kong